Avalon is Avalon's first studio album, released in December 1996 on Sparrow Records.  It includes a cover of the hymn "My Jesus, I Love Thee" and the Andrae Crouch song "Jesus Is Lord".  Produced by Charlie Peacock, Avalon catapulted the smooth quartet into the Christian music scene, with four No. 1 radio hits and a Dove Award from the Gospel Music Association in 1998 for "New Artist of the Year".

Track listing

Personnel 

Avalon
 Janna Long – vocals
 Jody McBrayer – vocals
 Nikki Hassman-Anders – vocals
 Michael Passons – vocals

Musicians
 Tony Miracle – keyboards (1–7), programming (1–7)
 Charlie Peacock – keyboards (2–7), programming (2–7)
 Pat Coil – keyboards (3, 5, 9), acoustic piano (4), programming (5)
 Tim Lauer – Hammond B3 organ (6, 7, 10)
 Rob Mathes – keyboards (8), arrangements (8)
 Tim Akers – acoustic piano (10), clavinet (10)
 Jerry McPherson – electric guitar (1–7, 9, 10), acoustic guitar (1, 6)
 Mark Baldwin – acoustic guitar (4)
 Scott Denté – acoustic guitar (7)
 Mark Hill – bass (3, 5, 9, 10)
 Jimmie Lee Sloas – bass (4)
 Brent Milligan – bass (6)
 Chris McHugh – drums (2, 3, 4, 6, 10)
 Steve Brewster – drums (5, 6, 9), drum programming (9)
 Eric Darken – percussion (6, 10)
 Mark Douthit – horns (10)
 Mike Haynes – horns (10)
 Tom Howard – string arrangements and conductor (3, 4, 5, 7)
 The Nashville String Machine – strings (3, 4, 5, 7)

Production
 Producer – Charlie Peacock 
 A&R – Grant Cunningham 
 Recorded by Shane D. Wilson
 Recording Assistants – Chad Fifield, Joe Hayden, Mel Jones, Richard Rose and Chris Schara.
 Recorded at re:Think Studio, Javelina Recording Studio and Sound Stage Studios (Nashville, TN).
 Mixing – Rick Will (Tracks 1, 4, 6, 9 & 10); Tom Laune (Tracks 2, 3, 5 & 7); Shane D. Wilson (Track 8).
 Mix Assistants – Graham Lewis (Tracks 1 & 4); Booch Skidmore (Track 2, 5, 6, 7, 9 & 10); Tony Green (Track 3).
 Mixed at Sound Stage Studios and October Studio (Nashville, TN).
 Production Coordinator – Katy Krippaehne
 Administrator – Andi Ashworth
 Art Direction – Sheri Halford
 Design – Joyce Revoir
 Additional Design – Bruce Ellefson
 Photography – Andrew Martin

Radio Singles 
 Give It Up+
 The Greatest Story+
 Picture Perfect World+
 Saviour Love
 This Love+

+ Denotes #1 Radio Hit

References

External links 
 ["Allmusic Review"]

1996 debut albums
Avalon (band) albums